The term Fusha may refer to:

 Fus·ha, also Fussha or al-fus·ha or the fus·ha, is the Arabic name for literary Arabic, which covers what is referred to in English as Modern Standard Arabic or Classical Arabic, from *fusha, “eloquent,” as opposed to 'ammiyya, “colloquial”
 Fusha, Guangdong (阜沙鎮), a town in the city of Zhongshan, Guangdong Province of China
 Fushë-Krujë, Albania